Judith Tondo Lungemba (born 20 June 1988), known as Judith Tondo, is a DR Congolese footballer who plays as a midfielder. She has been a member of the DR Congo women's national team.

International career
Tondo capped for the DR Congo at senior level during the 2012 African Women's Championship.

See also
 List of Democratic Republic of the Congo women's international footballers

References

External links

1988 births
Living people
Footballers from Kinshasa
Democratic Republic of the Congo women's footballers
Women's association football midfielders
Democratic Republic of the Congo women's international footballers
21st-century Democratic Republic of the Congo people